The Stamford Yacht Club is located in Stamford, Connecticut. The club is located on Stamford Harbor, and has approximately 550 members. The current commodore is Richard L. West. The yacht club hosts a number of significant sailboat races during the season, including the Vineyard Race, held every Labor Day weekend, and the Valeur-Jensen Stamford Denmark Race, held in the fall.

History

The Club was founded on October 16, 1890 at the home of William Lottimer.

The first race sailed at the club took place in August 1893. According to Yachts and Yachtsman of America, the race was open to sloops and cutters, 36 to 43 feet long. The course was from Cow's Buoy, off Shippan Point, to Matinnecock Point, then to Eaton's Neck and back, for a total of 25 miles. Kathleen, sailed by P.M. Hoyt of Stamford, was the winner.

Members of the club have won many prestigious yacht races, including the America's Cup, Fastnet Race, the Bermuda Race, the Great China Sea Race, the Ocean Race, and the SORC.

In 1990 as part of the Club's centennial celebrations, the Centennial Book Editorial Committee of 
the Stamford Yacht Club wrote "One hundred years : on sound and shore of Stamford Yacht Club, 1890-1990."

References

 Karen Jewell "A maritime history of the Stamford waterfront : Cove Island, Shippan Point and the Stamford harbor shoreline" (Charleston, SC : History Press, 2010)

External links 
 Stamford Yacht Club

1890 establishments in Connecticut
Long Island Sound
Yacht Club
Sailing in Connecticut
Yacht clubs in the United States
Sports in Fairfield County, Connecticut
Sports organizations established in 1890